Leo Lauri Leppä (28 May 1893, Lammi - 18 August 1958) was a Finnish Lutheran clergyman and politician. He was a member of the Parliament of Finland from 1945 to 1948, representing the National Coalition Party.

References

1893 births
1958 deaths
People from Hämeenlinna
People from Häme Province (Grand Duchy of Finland)
20th-century Finnish Lutheran clergy
National Coalition Party politicians
Members of the Parliament of Finland (1945–48)
Finnish people of World War II
University of Helsinki alumni